Aspidacanthina is a genus of flies in the family Stratiomyidae.

Species
Aspidacanthina exigua Lindner, 1966

References

Stratiomyidae
Brachycera genera
Taxa named by Erwin Lindner
Diptera of Africa